The 1997–98 NBA season was the Pistons' 50th season in the National Basketball Association, and 41st season in the city of Detroit. During the off-season, the Pistons signed free agents Brian Williams, and Malik Sealy. After winning their first two games, the Pistons lost five straight and struggled with a 6–11 start, as Joe Dumars missed ten games due to a shoulder injury during the first month of the season. In late December, the team traded Theo Ratliff and Aaron McKie to the Philadelphia 76ers in exchange for Jerry Stackhouse and Eric Montross. At midseason, head coach Doug Collins was fired after a 21–24 start, and was replaced with assistant Alvin Gentry; Collins would later on get a job as color analyst for the NBA on NBC. The Pistons held a 22–25 record at the All-Star break, then later on posted a 7-game losing streak between March and April, missing the playoffs finishing sixth in the Central Division with a disappointing 37–45 record.

Grant Hill had another stellar season, averaging 21.1 points, 7.7 rebounds, 6.8 assists and 1.8 steals per game, and was named to the All-NBA Second Team, selected for the 1998 NBA All-Star Game, and also finished in ninth place in Most Valuable Player voting, while Williams averaged 16.2 points and 8.9 rebounds per game. In addition, Stackhouse mostly played off the bench as the team's sixth man, averaging 15.7 points per game in 57 games after the trade, while Dumars provided the team with 13.1 points per game, and led them with 158 three-point field goals, and Lindsey Hunter contributed 12.1 points and 1.7 steals per game. Sealy contributed 7.7 points per game off the bench, and starting power forward Don Reid provided with 3.5 points and 2.6 rebounds per game.

Following the season, Sealy signed as a free agent with the Minnesota Timberwolves, while Grant Long re-signed with his former team, the Atlanta Hawks, and Rick Mahorn re-signed with his former team, the Philadelphia 76ers.

Draft picks

Roster

Regular season

Season standings

z - clinched division title
y - clinched division title
x - clinched playoff spot

Record vs. opponents

Game log

Player statistics

Player Statistics Citation:

Awards and records
Grant Hill, All-NBA Second Team

Transactions

 August 7, 1997: Acquired the 2003 1st Round Draft Pick (Darko Miličić) from the Vancouver Grizzlies for Otis Thorpe
 August 16, 1997: Signed Brian Williams
 October 9, 1997: Waived Randolph Childress
 October 25, 1997: Signed Malik Sealy
 December 18, 1997: Acquired Jerry Stackhouse, Eric Montross and a 2005 2nd Round Draft Pick (Alex Acker) from the Philadelphia 76ers for Aaron McKie, Theo Ratliff and a 2003 1st Round Draft Pick (Carlos Delfino)
 January 17, 1998: Signed Steve Henson to the first of two 10-day contracts
 February 9, 1998: Signed Steve Henson for the remainder of the season

Player Transactions Citation:

References

See also
1997-98 NBA season

Detroit Pistons seasons
Detroit
Detroit
Detroit